Kurt Anker Jørgensen (born 1 October 1959) is a Danish former footballer who played as a forward. While at Næstved BK the team finished second in the 1988 Danish 1st Division league championship. In the same year, he played two international matches for the Denmark national team. For Holbæk B&I, he made 231 first-team matches scoring 79 goals.

References

External links
 
 
 Profile at dbu.dk
 

Living people
1959 births
Sportspeople from British Columbia
Danish men's footballers
Association football forwards
Danish Superliga players
Køge Boldklub players
Næstved Boldklub players
FK Karlskrona players
Denmark international footballers
Holbæk B&I players
Expatriate footballers in Sweden
Danish expatriate men's footballers
Danish expatriate sportspeople in Sweden